Snezhana Khristakieva (born 11 March 1977) is a Bulgarian gymnast. She competed at the 1992 Summer Olympics. She has a skill named after her on the uneven bars in the women's Code of Points - a Gienger with full turn, although it is almost universally referred to as a Def (its name in the Men's code of points). It is considered a challenging skill, with the highest difficulty value of G.

Eponymous skill

External links

References

1977 births
Living people
Bulgarian female artistic gymnasts
Olympic gymnasts of Bulgaria
Gymnasts at the 1992 Summer Olympics
Sportspeople from Plovdiv
Originators of elements in artistic gymnastics